John Speed Elliott (May 9, 1889 – February 13, 1950) was an American football player and coach.  He served as the head football coach at the University of Virginia for one season, in 1912, compiling a record of 6–3.

Head coaching record

References

1889 births
1950 deaths
American football ends
Virginia Cavaliers football coaches
Virginia Cavaliers football players
People from Boonville, Missouri